The Meraldene Dam, or Barrage Meraldene, is an embankment dam on the Meraldene River, located at  southwest of Thénia in Boumerdès Province within Kabylia in Algeria.

Construction 
The design of this project was entrusted to the engineer-architect, Henri Chauzy, who had his office in Algiers.

The project for the realization of this hydraulic structure was approved on 24 May 1911 in order to carry out the water supply of the Meraldene River as well as the construction of the dam itself.

Auguste Schneider, a contractor based in Thénia at the time, carried out the work on this dam until its final acceptance. The dam was approved for use on 26 February 1913 by the city of Thénia and its railway station.

Indeed, this city created in 1872 required for its growth and economic development that there be a significant supply of fresh water, often difficult to achieve through wells and natural water sources.

Gallery

See also

 List of dams and reservoirs
 
 List of rivers of Algeria
 Meraldene River

External links

References

Dams in Algeria
Dams in Africa
Rock-filled dams
Buildings and structures in Boumerdès Province
Dams completed in 1913
Boumerdès Province
Thénia